Chirostoma humboldtianum, the shortfin silverside, is a species of neotropical silverside endemic to Mexico. It reaches a maximum length of around 20 cm. This species was described as Atherina humboldtiana by Achille Valenciennes in 1835 with a type locality of "Mexico". Valenciennes gave it its specific name in honour of the Prussian explorer Alexander von Humboldt (1769-1859).

References

humboldtianum
Freshwater fish of Mexico
Taxonomy articles created by Polbot
Fish described in 1835